The Eiffel Tower series of Robert Delaunay (1885 – 1941) is a cycle of paintings and drawings of the Eiffel Tower. Its main sequence was created between 1909 and 1912, with additional works added up to 1928. The series is considered the most prominent art depicting the iconic Paris tower as well as the most prominent work of Delaunay.

The series was painted in an emerging Orphist style, an art movement co-founded by Robert and Sonia Delaunay and František Kupka that added bright colors and increased abstraction to Cubism. The Eiffel Tower series sits chronologically and stylistically between the artist's Saint-Séverin series and Windows series.

Eiffel Tower as symbol

Course of style over series

List of works

Legacy
Delaunay's Eiffel Tower series is evoked in architectural paintings of other iconic buildings by his contemporary, the New York artist John Marin, in his Woolworth Building, No. 31 of 1912, and later by the Ontario artist Greg Curnoe's CN Tower series of the 1970s and 1980s.

The 1913 artist's book La prose du Transsibérien et de la Petite Jehanne de France, a collaborative work between Sonia Delaunay and the poet Blaise Cendrars, forms an epic narrative of a Trans-Siberian Railway journey that concludes in Paris at a Simultanist Eiffel Tower. They had announced a plan to sell 150 copies of the book, which would equal in height the Tower itself. 

The Russian film director Sergei Eisenstein's appreciation of Delaunay's work informed his Soviet montage theory, as he imagined developing cinematically "a dynamic fusion of a series, moving past the spectator, of those hundred views of the Eiffel Tower" rather than a "summation within a single canvas".

Cendrars's 1924 essay on Robert Delaunay describes his feminization of the Tower, and Sonia Delaunay described the Eiffel Tower as her husband's "Eve future" 

A 1911 painting from the series is featured in the 1980 BBC series 100 Great Paintings.

References

External links 

Painting series
1910s paintings
Architecture paintings
Eiffel Tower
Orphism (art)
Painting in Paris
Paintings by Robert Delaunay
Paintings in the collection of the Art Institute of Chicago
Paintings in the collection of the Solomon R. Guggenheim Museum
Paintings in the collection of the Museum of Modern Art (New York City)